This is a list of hiking trails in the U.S. state of Maryland.

A
Allegheny Highlands Trail of Maryland
American Discovery Trail
Anacostia Tributary Trail System
Appalachian Trail

B
Baltimore & Annapolis Trail
Billy Goat Trail
Borden Tunnel

C
Capital Crescent Trail 
Catoctin Trail
Cross Island Trail

D
Dalecarlia Tunnel

E
East Coast Greenway
Eastern Continental Trail

G
Great Allegheny Passage
Great Eastern Trail
Grist Mill Trail
Gwynns Falls Trail

H
Herring Run Trail

I
Indian Head Rail Trail

J
Jones Falls Trail

M
Ma and Pa Trail
Mason-Dixon Trail
Metropolitan Branch Trail
Muddy Branch Greenway Trail

N
North Bethesda Trail
Northwest Branch Trail

P
Patuxent Branch Trail
Potomac Heritage Trail

R
Rachel Carson Greenway
Rhode Island Avenue Trolley Trail

S
Savage Mill Trail
Seneca Creek Greenway Trail
Short Line Railroad Trail
Sligo Creek Trail

T
Torrey C. Brown Rail Trail
Trolley Line Number 9 Trail
Tuscarora Trail

W
Washington, Baltimore and Annapolis Trail
Western Maryland Rail Trail

References

Maryland